Kenneth Francis Gray  (24 June 1938 – 18 November 1992) was an international rugby union player from New Zealand. He represented New Zealand in 24 international games, playing lock and later prop forward.

Biography

Early life
He was born in 1938 in Porirua. He attended Plimmerton School and later Wellington College. As a child he was involved in many sports and showed a particular interest in rugby and showjumping.

He was a sheep farmer in Pauatahanui, the location of his family's farm. He was married to Joy with whom he had three children.

Rugby career
Gray played rugby for the Petone Rugby Club and was picked to play provincial rugby for Wellington before the age of 20. In 1963 he was selected for the All Blacks. He played 50 matches for New Zealand, 24 of them test matches, between then and 1969.

Gray was regarded as an intelligent, vigorous and highly mobile forward who was especially noted a lineout jumper. He could play on either side of a scrum. He captained Petone to win the Jubilee Cup three years in a row in 1967, 1968 and 1969.

In 1970, he refused to tour South Africa in protest at its policy of apartheid and retired from the game. Initially he cited family and business reasons for his sudden withdrawal from the game before the real reason was revealed several months later. He stressed his decision was a personal one and did not think that the New Zealand Rugby Union should have cancelled the tour as it was the government's decision "if it had the gumption".

Trevor Richards, national chairperson of Halt All Racist Tours (HART) said Gray's decision was a generation ahead of its time:

Gray was a prominent critic of 1981 Springbok tour of New Zealand and joined the public demonstrations and protests against on the tour.

Political career
He was elected a Hutt County Councillor in 1971 as the member for the Taupo riding. His father preceded him as a member of the Hutt County Council. In 1973 when the riding he represented was absorbed into the Porirua City Council he was elected as a Porirua City Councillor, serving until 1977. Later he was elected to the Hutt Valley Energy Board. He joined the Labour Party and became the vice-chairman of the Kapiti Labour Electorate Committee. Gray served as a board member for New Zealand Rail and chairman of the Government Health Sponsorship Council.

He publicly supported the legalisation of homosexuality in New Zealand, a stance for which he received much criticism from contemporaries. Fran Wilde, who introduced the bill to legalise, said Gray did much to dispel public ignorance on the issue.

In 1986 he was elected to the Wellington Regional Council on the Labour Party ticket where he continued to serve until his unexpected death in 1992. He was chair of the council's operations committee and between 1989 and 1992 he was the council's deputy chairman.

In the lead up to the 1987 election Gray put himself forward to replace the retiring Gerry Wall as Labour candidate for the Porirua electorate. He was regarded as the favourite in the lead up but in a shock upset he missed out on the nomination to trade unionist Graham Kelly. Three years later he stood for the Labour candidacy in the seat of Wanganui for the 1990 election, but missed out again.

In August 1992, Gray was selected as the Labour candidate for Western Hutt parliamentary electorate in the 1993 election, but he died before the election. This seat was held by National at the time. Historian Lindsay Knight said it was "a seat which he almost certainly would have won". Labour Party leader Mike Moore said "Ken was an outstanding citizen ... He was a man of firm principle. He would have made a marvellous Member of Parliament. Having given more than most people in two lifetimes, he still had so much more to give us."

Death
Gray died suddenly in his sleep of a heart attack (his brother Jim Gray also died of a heart attack in 1999) on 18 November 1992, aged 54 at his home in Pauatahanui. His funeral was at Old St Paul's, Wellington and he was buried at St Albans Churchyard, Pauatahanui.

Honours
In the 1990 Queen's Birthday Honours, Gray was appointed a Member of the Order of the British Empire, for services to local-body affairs.

The Petone Rugby Club, where he played, commemorates him with the Ken Gray Academy. The Ken Gray Education Centre was established in a converted shearing shed on the Battle Hill Forest Farm, near the Gray family farm, Pauatahanui Inlet near Pauatahanui, after his death.

References

External links
 Ken Gray Academy
 Ken Gray Education Centre

1938 births
1992 deaths
20th-century New Zealand politicians
New Zealand farmers
New Zealand international rugby union players
New Zealand Labour Party politicians
New Zealand Members of the Order of the British Empire
New Zealand people of Irish descent
New Zealand rugby union players
New Zealand sportsperson-politicians
People educated at Wellington College (New Zealand)
Porirua City Councillors
Rugby union players from Porirua
Rugby union props
Wellington regional councillors